Symphony station is an underground light rail station in Boston, Massachusetts on the "E" branch of the MBTA Green Line. It is located at the intersection of Massachusetts Avenue and Huntington Avenue. Symphony is the outermost underground station on the "E" branch; after leaving Symphony, outbound trolleys emerge onto the surface and continue down the median of Huntington Avenue. Symphony station is named after the nearby Symphony Hall.

The station is not accessible, but accessibility renovations are planned to begin in 2023.

History

Opening
The station opened February 16, 1941 as part of the Huntington Avenue tunnel, which was a Works Progress Administration project that eliminated streetcars from Boylston Street and Copley Square in order to ease congestion. The tunnel ran from just west of Copley to just east of Opera Place, with intermediate stations near the major performance halls at Mechanics and Symphony.

Modifications
Unusually for subway stations, the inbound and outbound tracks of the station are widely separated. The Huntington Avenue underpass was constructed at the same time as the station, with lanes for motor vehicles passing under Massachusetts Avenue at track level between the inbound and outbound platforms of the station. A sub-passage connected the two platforms; it was sealed off in the early 1960s when the MTA converted the station to no longer need employees present. Each platform had two entrance/exit stairways on opposite sides of Massachusetts Avenue, each of which split into a pair of stairways to street level.

In August 1978, the MBTA board authorized $91,750 for new glass entrance shelters for the station. Around that time, as part of the construction of the Symphony Plaza Towers, the stairways serving the inbound side were realigned, with each stairway from the station connecting to a single angled surface stairway rather than the original two.

From January 3, 1981 to June 1982, the station was closed due to budget cuts. Moderate renovations were performed to the station in the early 1990s which included new tiling and improved lighting.

Fare control
Since their construction, Symphony and Prudential were the only two underground stops on the Green Line where riders paid upon boarding the train rather than when entering the station. In May 2006, the MBTA installed the CharlieCard electronic fare collection system at the two stations, making them fare-controlled like the rest of the system. Passengers now pay with their CharlieCard or CharlieTicket at platform level when entering the station, and can board at any door to the train.

Planned renovations
Renovations are planned as part of the Light Rail Accessibility Project which would make Symphony station fully accessible. The renovations will include two elevators to each platform, platform modifications, and changes to other station elements to meet Americans with Disabilities Act of 1990 specifications. Planning proved difficult due to the number of historic structures in the area, as well as utility and code issues. Design reached 15% (conceptual) level in September 2011. 

Plans presented in July 2017 added emergency exits and restrooms as well as the accessibility renovations. The MBTA issued a $6 million design contract in August 2019. Design reached 75% in March 2021; station design was completed in early 2022, with utility design completed midyear. The project was split into two construction phases in 2022. Utility work was bid in August–September 2022, with construction expected to begin in spring 2023, while station work is planned to begin a year later. In December 2022, the MBTA was awarded a $66.6 million Federal Transit Administration grant to fund the renovations.

References

External links

MBTA - Symphony
 Massachusetts Avenue entrance from Google Maps Street View

Green Line (MBTA) stations
Railway stations located underground in Boston
Railway stations in the United States opened in 1941